Jack Edward Rudoni (born 14 June 2001) is an English professional footballer who plays as a midfielder for EFL Championship club Huddersfield Town.

Career

AFC Wimbledon
After being released by Crystal Palace at the age of 11, Rudoni signed for AFC Wimbledon. 

On 21 March 2019, he signed his first professional contract with the Dons. He scored his first goal for Wimbledon in an EFL Trophy tie against Bristol Rovers on 12 January 2021.

Huddersfield Town
On 15 July 2022, Rudoni signed for EFL Championship club Huddersfield Town for an undisclosed fee, signing a four-year contract. He made his debut for the club on the opening matchday of the 2022–23 season, replacing Josh Koroma in the 56th minute of a 1–0 loss to Burnley. The following week he made his first start for Huddersfield in a 2–1 away defeat at St Andrew's against Birmingham City.

Personal life
Born in England, Rudoni is of Mexican descent.

Career statistics

Honours 
Individual
 AFC Wimbledon Player of the Year: 2021–22

References

External links
 AFC Wimbledon profile
 

2000 births
Living people
Footballers from Carshalton
English footballers
English people of Mexican descent
Association football midfielders
AFC Wimbledon players
Corinthian-Casuals F.C. players
Tonbridge Angels F.C. players
English Football League players
Isthmian League players
National League (English football) players